Nana is a 1944 Mexican film by Celestino Gorostiza and Roberto Gavaldón. The film is an adaptation of Émile Zola's 1880 novel Nana, and is the last film of the Mexican star Lupe Vélez.

Plot
Based in the Émile Zola novel of the same name, which details the life of Nana, a French prostitute of the 19th century.

Cast
 Lupe Vélez as Nana
 Miguel Angel Ferríz as Muffat
 Chela Castro as Rosa Mignon
 Crox Alvarado as Fontan
 Luis Alcoriza as De Fauchery

Production notes
This was the last movie for Lupe Vélez, who committed suicide later in the same year.

There was a second Mexican adaptation of Nana, also called Nana, in 1985, produced by and starring Irma Serrano.

External links
 

1944 films
Mexican black-and-white films
1944 romantic drama films
Films based on works by Émile Zola
Films directed by Roberto Gavaldón
1940s Spanish-language films
Mexican romantic drama films
1940s Mexican films